Faidh El Botma is a town and commune in Djelfa Province, Algeria. According to the 2008 census it has a population of 26,857.

References

Communes of Djelfa Province
Djelfa Province